Ozawkie Township is a township in Jefferson County, Kansas, USA.  As of the 2000 census, its population was 1,408.

Geography
Ozawkie Township covers an area of 42.78 square miles (110.79 square kilometers); of this, 5.45 square miles (14.11 square kilometers) or 12.74 percent is water. The streams of Bowies Branch, Duck Creek, Fishpond Creek and French Creek run through this township.

Cities and towns
 Ozawkie

Unincorporated towns
 Indian Ridge
 Lake Shore
(This list is based on USGS data and may include former settlements.)

Adjacent townships
 Jefferson Township (northeast)
 Oskaloosa Township (east)
 Fairview Township (south)
 Rock Creek Township (west)
 Delaware Township (northwest)

Cemeteries
The township contains one cemetery, Fairview.

Major highways
 K-4
 K-92

References
 U.S. Board on Geographic Names (GNIS)
 United States Census Bureau cartographic boundary files

External links
 US-Counties.com
 City-Data.com

Townships in Jefferson County, Kansas
Townships in Kansas